Timothy David Warneford Edwards (born 6 December 1958) is an English former first-class cricketer.

Edwards was born at Merton in December 1958. He was educated at Sherborne School, before going up to Jesus College, Cambridge. While studying at Cambridge, he played first-class cricket for Cambridge University Cricket Club between 1979 and 1981, making twelve appearances. Playing in the Cambridge side as a batsman, Edwards scored 393 runs at an average of 20.68; he made one half century, a score of Nottinghamshire in 1981. As a part-time bowler, his only wicket at first-clas level was Sussex's Alan Wells.

References

External links

1958 births
Living people
People from the London Borough of Merton
People educated at Sherborne School
Alumni of Jesus College, Cambridge
English cricketers
Cambridge University cricketers